The 1927 Mecklenburg-Schwerin state election was held on 22 May 1927, with re-elections being held on 11 December 1927 in Grambow-Wendischhof and Sietow, to elect the 52 members of the Landtag of the Free State of Mecklenburg-Schwerin.

Results

References 

Mecklenburg-Schwerin
Elections in Mecklenburg-Western Pomerania